Megan Leigh (March 2, 1964 – June 16, 1990) was an American stripteaser and star of adult videos.

Early life
Leigh (née Michelle Marie Schei) was born in California. She ran away from home for the first time at age 14;  by age 16, she was working at a Guam massage parlor.

Death
Leigh's body was discovered on June 16, 1990, at her home in Solano County, California. The 26-year-old had died of a self-inflicted gunshot wound to the head.

References

External links
 
 
 
 

1964 births
1990 deaths
American female erotic dancers
American erotic dancers
American pornographic film actresses
Pornographic film actors from California
Suicides by firearm in California
1990 suicides
20th-century American actresses
People from Castro Valley, California
20th-century American dancers